Geza Schön is a German master perfumer born in Kassel and based in Berlin. He trained at Haarmann & Reimer (now Symrise) and has worked with Diesel, Ormonde Jayne, FCUK, biehl parfumkunstwerke, and Boudicca. In 2006, Schön created the brand Escentric Molecules, a perfume brand highlighting single molecules. He received the Outstanding Artist Award for Interdisciplinarity in 2016, then, in 2017, the Sadakichi Award for Experimental Work with Scent, together with Wolfgang Georgsdorf for "Osmodrama / Smeller 2.0".

Creations

Biehl Parfumkunstwerke  
 gs01
 gs02

Boudicca 
 Wode (2008)

Clive Christian 
 1872 for Men (2001)
 X for Men (2001)

Diesel 
 Diesel (1996)

Escentric Molecules 
 Escentric 01 (2006, 2011) 
 Escentric 02 (2008) 
 Escentric 03 (2010) 
 Escentric 04 (2017)
 Molecule 01 (2006) 
 Molecule 02 (2008) 
 Molecule 03 (2010) 
 Molecule 04 (2017)
 Molecule 05 (2020)

FCUK 
 Eau de FCUK (1999)

Feminista 
 Feminista (2017)

Ormonde Jayne 
 Ormonde Woman (2002)
 Champaca (2002)
 Tolu (2002)
 Fragipani Absolute (2003)
 Osmanthus (2003)
 Ormonde Man (2004)
 Ta'If (2004)
 Tiare (2009)
 Rose Gold (2016)

mare 
 eau du levant (2018)

Awards 
 2017: Sadakichi Award for Experimental Work with Scent (with Wolfgang Georgsdorf)

References

Living people
Perfumers
Year of birth missing (living people)